Keener, also known as Greenwood, is an unincorporated community in Etowah County, Alabama, United States.

History
Keener was named for George W. Keener, who donated for a station on the Alabama Great Southern Railroad. Iron ore was once mined in Keener, and the community had a sawmill, two cotton gins, five general stores, and a school. A post office operated under the name Greenwood from 1870 to 1888 and under the name Keener from 1888 to 1954.

References

Unincorporated communities in Etowah County, Alabama
Unincorporated communities in Alabama